The Rohia is a left tributary of the Lăpuș in Romania. It flows into the Lăpuș just west of Târgu Lăpuș.

References

Rivers of Romania
Rivers of Maramureș County